Short Fictions is an American Emo band based in Pittsburgh, Pennsylvania. The band consists of Sam Treber on guitar and vocals, Alex Martin on bass, Chloe June on guitar, Alex Barkley on Bass VI, Ryan Veith on drums, and Nick Bursick on trombone.

History 

The band formed in 2015 and initially consisted of just Sam Treber, and Shimpei Blackriver. The two were joined by Alex Martin, Alex Barkley, and Ryan Veith in 2017. Nick Bursick joined in 2019 amidst a month long tour that ultimately resulted in his joining the band permanently.

The band released three extended plays before releasing their debut album in December, 2019.  Their debut EP, Light Ascending out of Gloom: a Collection of Short Fictions and Poetry came out in May 2016.  A year later, their second EP The Heart is a Kaleidoscope was released, followed by There's a Dark Shadow on the Flames of the Burning Sun in 2018. 

On December 13, 2019, the band's debut album, Fates Worse than Death, was released. It was met with positive critical reception.

Discography 
Extended Plays

 Light Ascending out of Gloom: a Collection of Short Fictions and Poetry (2016)
 The Heart is a Kaleidoscope (2017)
 There's a Dark Shadow on the Flames of the Burning Sun (2018)

Albums

 Fates Worse than Death (2019)

References 

Musical groups from Pittsburgh
Alternative rock groups from Pennsylvania